The women's long jump at the 2013 Asian Athletics Championships was held at the Shree Shiv Chhatrapati Sports Complex on 3 July.

Results

References
Results

Long
Long jump at the Asian Athletics Championships
2013 in women's athletics